The sailfin tang (Zebrasoma velifer) is a marine reef tang in the fish family Acanthuridae. They may live at water depths of 1 - 60 m (3 - 200 ft) or more. The fish grow to a maximum length of 40 cm (15.8 in).  It has an extensive range throughout Oceania, the Indian Ocean, and the South Pacific. Zebrasoma velifer is a popular fish in the aquarium trade.  They are herbivorous fish specializing in filamentous algae. Though their skin is light beige with stripes, it can turn dark brown under stress.

Description

This species is one of the largest members of its genus. The largest scientifically measured sailfin tang was 40.0 cm (15.7 in).

The body of the sailfin tang is disc-shaped with a much elevated dorsal fin and a big anal fin. It has an extended snout. Compared to the other members of the genus Zebrasoma, the sailfin tang has larger but fewer pharyngeal teeth. On each side of the caudal peduncle is a single sharp spine (the so-called scalpel) which is used for defence and to establish dominance. When the fish is not using its scalpel, it is folded down inside a groove.

The sailfin tang is decorated with broad, pale yellow bands that alternate with darker bands over its body. The bending extends into both dorsal and anal fins. On the darker bands are yellow dots and stripes. The caudal fin is yellow.  The head of the fish is white adorned with yellow dots. A dark band with yellow dots runs across the eye and another dark band with dots is located right behind the eye.

Juvenile specimens look similar to the adult fish, but with more yellow colouring.

References

External links
 

Acanthuridae
Fish of Hawaii
Fish described in 1795